Patryk Adrian Małecki (born 1 August 1988) is a Polish professional footballer who plays for Stal Rzeszów as a winger.

Club career
He made his Wisła Kraków and Ekstraklasa debut on 10 September 2006 in a 0–0 draw against Pogoń Szczecin. He scored his first goal against Górnik Zabrze in the 82nd minute to make the final score 4–0 for Wisla.

He was in very good form and was expected to play alongside Paweł Brożek in the attack for Wisła Kraków. However, an injury sidelined him for the rest of the season. During the 2008–09 season, he became a regular in Wisła's starting eleven playing on the right wing, replacing Wojciech Łobodziński.

He was chosen as the revelation of the year 2009 and most promising player for Euro 2012 by Ekstraklasa players. Also in the Piłka nożna magazine plebiscite he was chosen as the 2009 Polish Newcomer of the Year.

Malecki was the first Pole to play for Spartak Trnava.

On 22 June 2019 it was announced, that Małecki had been sold to Zagłębie Sosnowiec.

International career
He has represented Poland at youth international level, including at the 2007 FIFA U-20 World Cup in Canada, where he started in all 4 games for Poland.

Career statistics

Honours
Wisła Kraków
Ekstraklasa: 2007–08, 2008–09, 2010–11

Spartak Trnava
Slovak Cup: 2018–19

Stal Rzeszów
II liga: 2021–22

Individual
Football Oscar for revelation of the year: 2009
Polish revelation of the year: 2009

References

External links
 
 
 

Living people
1988 births
People from Suwałki
Sportspeople from Podlaskie Voivodeship
Association football wingers
Polish footballers
Poland youth international footballers
Poland under-21 international footballers
Wisła Kraków players
Zagłębie Sosnowiec players
Eskişehirspor footballers
Pogoń Szczecin players
Wigry Suwałki players
FC Spartak Trnava players
Stal Rzeszów players
Ekstraklasa players
Slovak Super Liga players
Süper Lig players
I liga players
II liga players
Poland international footballers
Polish expatriate footballers
Expatriate footballers in Turkey
Polish expatriate sportspeople in Turkey
Expatriate footballers in Slovakia
Polish expatriate sportspeople in Slovakia